Daja may refer to:
Sefer Daja
Daja Kisubo